{{Infobox company
| name = Helvetia Holding AG
| logo = Helvetia Insurance logo.svg
| caption = 
| native_name = 
| native_name_lang = de
| type = Aktiengesellschaft
| traded_as = 
| ISIN = 
| industry = Insurance
| fate = 
| predecessor = 
| successor = 
| foundation = 1858
| founder = 
| defunct = 
| location_city = St. Gallen, Switzerland
| location_country = 
| locations = 
| area_served = 
| key_people = Philipp Gmür (CEO) Doris Russi Schurter (President of the Board of Directors)
| products = 
| services = 
| revenue = 9.714 bn CHF (2020) (business volume)<ref name=results18>https://www.helvetia.com/content/dam/os/corporate/web/documents/investor-relations/business-publications/brochure/2020/corporate-brochure-2020.pdf Helvetia.com. Retrieved 2021-05-31</ref>
| operating_income = 
| net_income = 
| assets = 
| equity = 
| num_employees = 11,687 (2020)
| homepage = www.helvetia.com
}}

Helvetia is a globally active Swiss insurance group. The group of companies has been organised in a holding structure since 1996. The head office of Helvetia Group is located in St Gallen.

 Corporate structure 
The group of companies employs some 11,700 employees across the world and operates apart from Switzerland also in Germany, Austria, Italy, France and Spain as well as in Latin America and Asia. Globally, the company works as a special and re-insurer.  The parent company of Helvetia Group is Helvetia Holding AG, whose registered shares are listed on the Swiss SIX Swiss Exchange. The biggest shareholder of the insurance group is Patria co-operative with a stake of 34.1 per cent.

 Financial results of Helvetia Holding 

History
In 1858 Helvetia was established by Eastern Swiss business people and entrepreneurs as Allgemeine Versicherungs-Gesellschaft Helvetia in St Gallen. It was the first company in Switzerland to offer an insurance against risks of transport by land, river and sea. Three years later, an own private fire insurance company was established in St Gallen called Helvetia Feuer. The occasion was the fire of Glarus, which revealed shortcomings in the building insurance system.

Over the course of its history, Helvetia expanded into all five continents and thereby laid the foundation for its business activities outside of Switzerland. In 1862 Helvetia Feuer established its first branches in Germany and expanded from 1876 into the US, where it opened branches in California and New York. Between 1920 and 1962 further Helvetia subsidiaries were set up in France, Italy, Greece (sold in 1997), the Netherlands (sold 1995) and Canada (sold in 1999). In Austria the history of Helvetia goes back to the establishment of Der Anker, Gesellschaft von Lebens- und Rentenversicherung in 1858. Until 2006, Helvetia Austria also operated under this name. The establishment of subsidiaries in Spain, Italy and Germany took place between 1986 and 1988.

In 1968 Allgemeine Versicherungs-Gesellschaft Helvetia merged with Helvetia Unfall and Helvetia Leben. The medium-sized insurance group has offered the entire product range in life and non-life insurance since then. In 1974 Helvetia Feuer and Helvetia Allgemeine merged to form Helvetia Feuer. On 11 October 1988 the shareholders decided in an extraordinary general meeting of Helvetia Feuer and Helvetia Unfall to separate the two partner companies in full. Helvetia Unfall took the name Elvia (belongs to Allianz Global Assistance today), which it subsidiary active as a reinsurer already had. Helvetia Feuer was renamed as Helvetia Versicherungen and given a new mission statement and branding. The three-dimensional triangular symbol was introduced.

 Helvetia and Patria 
In 1996 the company merged with the long-standing Basel-based life insurer Patria. The beginnings of Patria go back to the establishment of Basler Sterbe- und Alters-Kasse in 1878. The charitable pension fund was the first to insure the life of socially disadvantaged people with the aim of being an actual national insurer. After numerous changes in name and mergers, Schweizerische Lebensversicherungsgesellschaft Patria was established in 1910. In 1992 Helvetia and Patria decide to develop the Swiss market jointly in the future and enter into a strategic alliance. In June 1996 Helvetia Patria Holding is established.

 Further development 
In 2010 Helvetia bought the Swiss insurers Alba Allgemeine Versicherungs-Gesellschaft AG (Alba) and Phenix Versicherungsgesellschaft AG and Phenix Lebensversicherungsgesellschaft AG'' (Phenix). The purchase price of CHF 302 million was paid with equity capital. The Alba/Phenix range in sickness/accident insurance was sold to the two insurance companies innova and Solida.

In 2014 Nationale Suisse and Austria's subsidiary of Baloise were taken over. For this acquisition, Helvetia increased its stake in Nationale Suisse to more than 98 per cent and then initiated the procedure to declare the remaining shares void. Nationale Suisse also consisted of smile.direct, Switzerland's leading online insurer. It also became part of Helvetia Group with the takeover. The acquisition was one of the biggest insurance takeover in recent years in Switzerland.

In 2016 Helvetia took over 70 per cent of the shares in the online mortgage broker MoneyPark. The purchase price was about 107 million francs. With this majority stake, Helvetia entered the Swiss mortgage business. “In particular, however, the addition is a key step towards digitalisation and more customer focus within the framework of our strategy,” said Helvetia CEO Philipp Gmür.

At the beginning of 2017, the company announced that it would invest in startups via an own venture funds, which support the transformation of the existing core business or develop new business models. The fund is endowed with some CHF 55 million and plans to invest in some 25 new companies. Among other things, the venture fund has invested in Volocopter, flatfox, Pricehubble or in the Insurtech INZMO. Furthermore, Helvetia has established a programme for the development of in-house startups and promotes startups with an accelerator programme.

Group Executive Board and Board of Directors 
Helvetia is managed by an Executive Board of eleven people. Philipp Gmür has been its chairman since 1 September 2016. The Board of Directors has eleven members. It is chaired by Doris Russi Schurter. She held the office ad interim already in 2015 before Pierin Vincenz was elected as its Chairman. He resigned in December 2017 due to an investigation by Swiss Financial Market Supervisory Authority FINMA against him into his former activities at Raiffeisen. In April 2018 Doris Russi Schurter was officially elected as the successor to Vincenz at the annual general meeting.

International activities 
Helvetia is increasingly positioning itself with a cross-country brand appearance in Western Europe. In the countries of Austria, Germany, Italy and Spain, which are summarised in the Europe segment, Helvetia is organised in own national companies. Here, as in Switzerland, the focus is on the business with private customers and small and medium-sized companies. Helvetia offers all key non-life products in these countries. 32% of the total business volume originates from the Europe segment. In the non-life area, this figure is even 42%.

In the Specialty Markets segment, Helvetia the special insurances of art, engineering and transport as well as active reinsurance solutions around the globe. To this end, Helvetia has branches in Istanbul, in Miami for the Latin American and in Kuala Lumpur and Singapore for the Asia markets. The French subsidiary also offers transport and art insurances.

Art and art award 
Helvetia has an art collection of more than 300 contemporary Swiss artists. At the Helvetia Art Foyer in Basel, works from the collection are exhibited and artists invited to provide individual exhibitions. Furthermore, the Helvetia Art Award has been bestowed annually since 2004. The honours the a graduate of a Swiss arts college. The award provides the opportunity to exhibit at the LISTE international art fair and prize money of 15,000 francs.

Previous winners:

2020: Tiphanie Kim Mall, Basel Academy of Art and Design

2019: Kaspar Ludwig, Basel Academy of Art and Design

2018: Gina Proenza, Ecole cantonale d'art de Lausanne

2017: Andriu Deplazes, Zurich University of the Arts

2016: STELLA; Zurich University of the Arts

2015: Dijan Kahrimanovic, F+F School for Art and Media Design, Zurich

2014: Thomas Moor, Zurich University of the Arts

2013: Michael Meier & Christoph Franz, Zurich University of the Arts

2012: Kathrin Affentranger, Bern University of the Arts

2011: Josse Bailly, Haute école d'art et de design Genève

2010: Elisa Larvego, Haute école d'art et de design Genève

2009: Florian Germann, Zurich University of the Arts

2008: Nicole Bachmann, Zurich University of the Arts

2007: Luc Mattenberger, Haute école d'art et de design Genève

2006: Aloïs Godinat, Ecole cantonale d'art de Lausanne

2005: Swann Thommen (collectif-fact), Haute école d'art et de design Genève

2004: Kathrin Stengele, Bern University of the Arts

Sponsoring and commitment 
Since the 2005/06 season, Helvetia has been an association sponsor of Swiss-Ski, the Swiss ski association and umbrella organisation of Swiss snow sports. It supports some 250 athletes from eight disciplines. Since 2016, Helvetia has also been Presenting Partner of the Swiss Football Cup. Helvetia also supports projects in neighbouring European countries, such as the Cross-Country Skiing World Cup.

Helvetia is committed to the creation of protection forests and supports the Alpine Protection Forest Award as the main sponsor since 2014.

References

External links
 Website of Helvetia Switzerland
 Website of Helvetia Group
 Helvetia Patria Jeunesse Foundation
 Helvetia Holding AG
 History - Helvetia Schweizerische Feuerversicherungs-Gesellschaft St. Gallen

Financial services companies established in 1858
Insurance companies of Switzerland
Companies listed on the SIX Swiss Exchange